Backlog is a joint compilation album by electronic musicians Leftfield and Djum Djum, released in 1992.  It contained mixes of Leftfield's first two releases "Not Forgotten" and "More Than I Know" from between 1990 and 1991 and two mixes by Neil Barnes of the Djum Djum track "Difference". It was released on CD in December 1992 on the Outer Rhythm label. Djum Djum is the stage name of rapper Neil Cole.

Track listing
All tracks written by Neil Barnes except where stated.
 "Not Forgotten" (Original Mix) - 6:39 
 "Not Forgotten" (Fateh's On the Case Mix) - 6:12
 "Not Forgotten" (Dub Mix) - 4:46
 "More Than I Know" (12" Mix) 6:42
 "Not Forgotten" (Hard Hands Mix) - 7:36
 "More Than I Know" (10k Mix) - 8:37
 "More Than I Know" (More Mix) - 7:29
 "More Than I Know" (Even More Mix) - 4:22
 "Difference" (Steng Mix) - 7:06 (Djum Djum) - written by Neil Cole (aka Djum Djum)/Neil Barnes
 "Difference" (Cake Mix) - 6:41 (Djum Djum) - written by Neil Cole (aka Djum Djum)/Neil Barnes

Credits
Production: Neil Barnes, Neil Cole (9, 10), Paul Daley (5)
Engineer: Mat Clarke

References

Electronic albums by English artists
Leftfield albums
1992 compilation albums